Wheeling Island Hotel-Casino-Racetrack (formerly Wheeling Downs) is a greyhound racino located on Wheeling Island in the middle of the Ohio River, which is a part of the city of Wheeling, West Virginia. It is located just off the Wheeling Island exit of I-70, 40 minutes west of Washington, Pennsylvania and about two hours east of Columbus, Ohio. It is owned by Delaware North.

It features slot machines, which are marketed under the term "video lottery" in West Virginia; live greyhound racing, and off-track betting for both greyhound and horse racing. In addition, a full complement of table games including poker, blackjack, craps, and roulette were recently added. Poker was added on October 19, 2007, and the other games on December 20, 2007 as a result of Ohio County voters approving a referendum in a June 9, 2007 special election.

Wheeling Island features several restaurants and food operations as well, in addition to live concerts and boxing.

The facility has a "tropical" theme, similar to that used by the Treasure Island Hotel and Casino in Las Vegas, but is unrelated.  Its logo features a palm tree and tropical colors, although Wheeling Island is a residential part of the city and located far from the tropics. Smoking is permitted in select areas of the casino. 
As the casino is located on Wheeling Island, a low-lying area surrounded by the Ohio River, it is prone to flooding. The casino floor is elevated some ten-and-one-half feet above ground level, thus surmounting the hundred-year flood level.

Wheeling Downs began its life as a thoroughbred race track in 1937 and continued in that capacity until a 1962 fire heavily damaged the property, keeping it closed for the next 5 years. When it reopened it switched to standardbred harness racing. Greyhound racing was introduced in 1976, under the ownership of the Ogden Corporation, who bought the track in 1969. In 1988, Ogden sold Wheeling Downs to Delaware North. From 1994 to 2001, Delaware North co-owned Wheeling Downs with Wheeling-Pittsburgh Steel.

The casino served as the site of the Wheeling Jamboree from fall 2012 to 2015.

As of 2023, Wheeling Island is one of only two live greyhound tracks in the United States, along with its sister racino Mardi Gras Casino and Resort in Nitro, West Virginia.

See also
List of casinos in West Virginia 
List of casinos in the United States 
List of casino hotels

References

External links

 WheelingIsland.com - Official Site
 arabiconlinecasinos - Official Site

Casinos in West Virginia
Buildings and structures in Wheeling, West Virginia
Tourist attractions in Ohio County, West Virginia
Defunct horse racing venues in the United States
Greyhound racing venues in the United States
Casino hotels